The NSW Challenge Cup is a rugby league football competition played in Sydney, New South Wales. The competition is administered by the New South Wales Rugby League.

NSW Challenge Cup Premiers

Premiership Tally

See also

 Pre-season Cup
 Canterbury Cup NSW
 Ron Massey Cup
 Sydney Shield
 President Cup

Rugby League Competitions in Australia

References

Rugby league competitions in New South Wales
Recurring sporting events established in 2017
2017 establishments in Australia
Sports leagues established in 2017
Rugby league in Sydney
Amco Cup
Professional sports leagues in Australia
National cup competitions